This is a list of albums by Frank Zappa, including all those credited to the Mothers of Invention. During his lifetime, Zappa released 62 albums. Since 1994, the Zappa Family Trust has released 62 posthumous albums as of January 2023, making a total of 125 albums/album sets.

In 2012 the distribution of Zappa's recorded output moved to Universal Music Enterprises. In June 2022 the Zappa Trust announced that it had sold Zappa's entire catalog to Universal Music, including master tapes, song copyrights and trademarks.

A list of albums of Zappa's music by other artists is also included here.

Official albums

Posthumous official albums

Miscellaneous

Compilation albums

Singles

As sideman 
 The Penguins - "Memories of El Monte" (Original Sound, 1963)
 Bob Guy - "Dear Jeepers", B-side "Letter from Jeepers" (Del-Fi, 1963)
 The Heartbreakers - "Every Time I See You", B-side "Cradle Rock" (Del-Fi, 1964)
 Bobby Jameson - "Gotta Find My Roogalator", B-side "Reconsider Baby" (Penthouse, 1966), uncredited
 The Animals - Animalism (MGM Records, 1966)
 Burt Ward - Boy Wonder I Love You (MGM, 1966)
 Barry Goldberg - Carry On (Verve/Folkways, 1967)
 Wild Man Fischer - An Evening with Wild Man Fischer (Bizarre/Reprise, 1968)
 The GTOs - Permanent Damage (Straight, 1969)
 Jeff Simmons - Lucille Has Messed My Mind Up (Straight, 1970)
 John Lennon - Some Time in New York City (Apple, 1972)
 Ruben and the Jets - For Real! (Mercury, 1973)
 George Duke - Feel (Verve, 1974), credited as Obdewl'l X
 Grand Funk Railroad - Good Singin', Good Playin' (MCA, 1976)
 Robert Charlebois - Swing Charlebois Swing (Solution/RCA France, 1977), on "Petroleum"
 Flint - Flint (Columbia, 1978)
 L. Shankar - Touch Me There (Zappa, 1979), credited as Stucco Homes
 Pražský výběr - Adieu C. A. (Art Production K, 1992)

Albums by other artists 
 Jean-Luc Ponty - King Kong: Jean-Luc Ponty Plays the Music of Frank Zappa (1970)
 Plastic Ono Band - Some Time in New York City (1972)
 BRT Big Band - The BRT Big Band Plays Frank Zappa (1990)
 Yahonza - Yahozna Plays Zappa (1992)
 Joel Thome/Orchestra of Our Time - Zappa's Universe—A Celebration of 25 Years of Frank Zappa's Music(1993)
 Meridian Arts Ensemble - Smart Went Crazy (1993)
 Harmonia Ensemble - Harmonia Meets Zappa (1994)
 Jon Poole - What's the Ugliest Part of Your Body? (1994)
 Omnibus Wind Ensemble - Music by Frank Zappa (1995)
 Warren Cuccurullo - Thanks to Frank (1995)
 Meridian Arts Ensemble - Prime Meridian  (1995)
 Meridian Arts Ensemble - Anxiety of Influence  (1996)
 Muffin Men - Frankincense: The Muffin Men Play Zappa   (1997)
 The Ed Palermo Big Band - Plays the Music of Frank Zappa (1997)
 CoCö Anderson - Dischordancies Abundant (1997)
 Pierre-Jean Gaucher - Zappe Zappa (1998)
 Meridian Arts Ensemble - Ear Mind I  (1998)
 Ossi Duri - Sta Chitarra Ammazzera 'Tua Madre (1998)
 The Persuasions - Frankly a Cappella (2000)
 Ensemble Ambrosius - The Zappa Album   (2000)
 Bohuslän Big Band - Bohuslän Big Band plays Frank Zappa (2000)
 Nasal Retentive Orchestra - Fric Out ! (2001)
 Nasal Retentive Orchestra - Have a Bun (2002)
 Le Concert Impromptu & Bossini - Prophetic Attitude (2002)
 Ensemble Modern - Ensemble Modern Plays Frank Zappa: Greggery Peccary & Other Persuasions (2003)
 UMO Jazz Orchestra - UMO plays Frank Zappa feat. Marzi Nyman (2003)
 Nasal Retentive Orchestra - Tales of Brave Flegmar (2003)
 LeBocal - Oh No!... Just Another Frank Zappa Memorial Barbecue! (2003)
 Prząśniczki & Tymon Tymański - Zapparcie, czyli uboczne skutki jedzenia żółtego śniegu (2003)
 BRTN Philharmonic Orchestra & Zucchini Rocking Teenage Combo - The Purple Cucumber - A Zappa Tribute (2003 and 2008)
 Nasal Retentive Orchestra - NRO Live (2004)
 Lemme Take You to the Beach: Surf Instrumental Bands Playing the Music of Zappa (Cordelia, 2005)
 Colin Towns and the NDR bigband - Frank Zappa's Hot Licks (and Funny Smells) (rent a dog, 2005)
 Marc Guillermont - Zappostrophe (2005)
 The Ed Palermo Big Band - Take Your Clothes Off When You Dance (2006)
 Nasal Retentive Orchestra - Music for Hungry People (2007)
 Struber Z'Tett - Struber Z'Tett Plays Zappa Live : Les Noces de Dada (2007)
 Pierre-Jean Gaucher & Christophe Godin - 2G (2007)
 Dweezil Zappa - Zappa Plays Zappa (2008)
 The Ed Palermo Big Band - Eddy Loves Frank (2009)
 The Norwegian Wind Ensemble - The Brass from Utopia (A Frank Zappa Tribute) (2013)
 The Norwegian Radio Orchestra - Perfect Strangers (Heiner Goebbels, Frank Zappa) (2014)
 Stefano Bollani - Sheik Yer Zappa (2014)
 Quintorigo con Roberto Gatto - Around Zappa (Live at Blue Note Milano) (DVD, 2015)
 Marco Pacassoni Group - Frank & Ruth (2018)

Sales awards 
  (70,000 sales)
 January 1976: Gold record for "Just Another Band From LA"
 January 1976: Gold record for "Fillmore East"
  (50,000 sales)
 November 1991: Gold record for "Bobby Brown"
  (100,000 sales)
 September 1979: Gold record for "Sheik Yerbouti"
 November 1979: Gold record for "Joe's Garage"
  (1,000,000 sales)
 1991: Gold record for European releases
  (100,000 sales)
 December 1979: Gold record for "Sheik Yerbouti"
  (500,000 sales)
 January 1980: Gold record for "Sheik Yerbouti"
 January 1980: Gold record for "Bobby Brown"
  (50,000 sales)
 January 1980: Gold record for "Bobby Brown"
  (50,000 sales)
 October 1993: Gold record for "Bobby Brown"
  (50,000 sales)
 December 1980: Gold record for "Bobby Brown"
  (60,000 sales)
 March 1979: Silver record for "Zoot Allures"
  (1,100,000 sales)
 April 1976: Gold record for "Apostrophe (')"
 November 1976: Gold record for "Over-Nite Sensation"
 June 2006: Gold record for "Does Humor Belong in Music?"
 February 2015: Gold record for "Baby Snakes"

Notes

References

External links 
 Official Frank Zappa website
 

 
Rock music discographies
Jazz discographies
Discographies of American artists